The thoracodorsal nerve is a nerve present in humans and other animals, also known as the middle subscapular nerve or the long subscapular nerve. It supplies the latissimus dorsi muscle.

Structure 
The thoracodorsal nerve arises from the brachial plexus. It derives its fibers from the sixth, seventh, and eighth cervical nerves. It is derived from their ventral rami, in spite of the fact that the latissimus dorsi is found in the back. The thoracodorsal nerve is a branch of the posterior cord of the brachial plexus, and is made up of fibres from the posterior divisions of all three trunks of the brachial plexus.

It follows the course of the subscapular artery, along the posterior wall of the axilla to the latissimus dorsi muscle, in which it may be traced as far as the lower border of the muscle.

Function 
The thoracodorsal nerve innervates the latissimus dorsi muscle on its deep surface.

Clinical Significance 
The latissimus dorsi is occasionally used for transplantation, and for augmentation of systole in cardiac failure. In these cases, the nerve supply is preserved, and transplanted with the muscle (for example, with facial reanimation).

Posterior cord lesions can result in the loss of adduction of the shoulder joint, as innervation to latissimus dorsi is lost.

Additional images

References

External links
 Dissection Video of Superficial Back showing the Thoracodorsal Nerve
  - "The major subdivisions and terminal nerves of the brachial plexus."
 Thoracodorsal Nerve - BlueLink Anatomy - University of Michigan Medical School

Nerves of the upper limb